The Johannesburg Roads Agency is a department of the Government of Gauteng. JRA began on business on 1 January 2001 with the City of Johannesburg being the main shareholder. The JRA's plans, designs, constructs, operates, controls, rehabilitates and maintains the roads and stormwater infrastructure in Johannesburg. This Extends to constructing and maintaining of bridges, culverts, traffic Lights, pathways, road signs and markings.

Background

Facilities

Asphalt Plant 
The JRA operates and manages an asphalt plant in Johannesburg. The plant opened due to a shortage in asphalt and the ongoing problem of potholes in Johannesburg. Due to the COVID-19 pandemic, the plant shut down temporarily and reopened April 2021.

See also
 Government of Gauteng
 Department of Transport (South Africa)
 Department of Public Works (South Africa)
 SANRAL
 Gauteng Department of Roads and Transport

References

External links
 JRA Website

Roads Agency
Gauteng
Gauteng
Transport in Gauteng
Transport organisations based in South Africa